Erina Jeke (born 16 September 1990) is a Zimbabwean footballer. She represented Zimbabwe in the football competition at the 2016 Summer Olympics.

References

Zimbabwean women's footballers
1990 births
Living people
Footballers at the 2016 Summer Olympics
Olympic footballers of Zimbabwe
Zimbabwe women's international footballers
Women's association football forwards